Archer John Porter Martin  (1 March 1910 – 28 July 2002) was a British chemist who shared the 1952 Nobel Prize in Chemistry for the invention of partition chromatography with Richard Synge.

Early life
Martin's father was a GP. Martin was educated at Bedford School, and Peterhouse, Cambridge.

Career
Working first in the Physical Chemistry Laboratory, he moved to the Dunn Nutritional Laboratory, and in 1938 moved to Wool Industries Research Institution in Leeds. He was head of the biochemistry division of Boots Pure Drug Company from 1946 to 1948, when he joined the Medical Research Council. There, he was appointed head of the physical chemistry division of the National Institute for Medical Research in 1952, and was chemical consultant from 1956 to 1959.

He specialised in biochemistry, in some aspects of vitamins E and B2, and in techniques that laid the foundation for several new types of chromatography. He developed partition chromatography whilst working on the separation of amino acids, and later developed gas-liquid chromatography. Amongst many honours, he received his Nobel Prize in 1952.

After his retirement from the University of Sussex, he was visiting professor at both the University of Houston in Texas and the EPFL (École Polytechnique Fédérale de Lausanne) in Switzerland.

He published far fewer papers than the typical Nobel winners—only 70 in all—but his ninth paper contained the work that would eventually win him the Nobel Prize.  The University of Houston dropped him from its chemistry faculty in 1979 (when he was 69 years old) because he was not publishing enough.

Awards
Archer Martin shared the 1952 Nobel Prize in Chemistry for the invention of partition chromatography with Richard Synge.

Archer Martin's 1954 paper with A. T. James, "Gas-Liquid Chromatography: A Technique for the Analysis and Identification of Volatile Materials” reported the discovery of gas-liquid chromatography. This publication was honoured by a Citation for Chemical Breakthrough Award from the Division of History of Chemistry of the American Chemical Society presented in 2016 to the Francis Crick Institute.

The research was actually performed at the National Institute for Medical Research in Mill Hill, which became the Francis Crick Institute in 2015.

Martin was elected a Fellow of the Royal Society in 1950, and made a CBE in 1960.

Personal life
In 1943 he married Judith Bagenal (1918–2006), and together they had two sons and three daughters. In the last years of his life he suffered from Alzheimer's disease.

References

External links
 
 
 Martin's Nobel lecture: The Development of Partition Chromatography
M Martin's Column's: Classic Kit

1910 births
2002 deaths
Alumni of Peterhouse, Cambridge
English biochemists
Scientists from London
Nobel laureates in Chemistry
British Nobel laureates
People educated at Bedford School
Fellows of the Royal Society
English Nobel laureates
English physical chemists
National Institute for Medical Research faculty
Commanders of the Order of the British Empire